Smith is a lunar impact crater that is located within the huge walled plain Apollo, on the far side of the Moon. This crater is attached to the west-southwestern outer rim of Scobee and it overlies the northern edge of the inner mountain ring within Apollo. To the north lies Barringer.

This crater is roughly circular and bowl-shaped, with a mildly worn outer rim. 
Some piles of scree lie along the base of the inner wall in the northern part of the crater. The interior floor is relatively featureless, with a small hill at the midpoint of the crater.

References 

 
 
 
 
 
 
 
 
 
 
 
 

Impact craters on the Moon